Alonso Llano Ruiz (June 19, 1931 – March 26, 2015) was a Colombian Roman Catholic  bishop.

Ordained to the priesthood in 1973, Llano Ruiz was appointed bishop of the Diocese of Istmina–Tadó, Colombia and retired in 2010.

See also

Notes

1931 births
2015 deaths
21st-century Roman Catholic bishops in Colombia
20th-century Roman Catholic bishops in Colombia
Roman Catholic bishops of Ismina-Tadó